Acraea kaduna, the Kaduna acraea, is a butterfly in the family Nymphalidae. It is found in Nigeria. The habitat consists of flood plains and swamps around Kaduna and Zaria.

Taxonomy
It is a member of the Acraea rahira species group-   but see also Pierre & Bernaud, 2014

References

kaduna
Butterflies of Africa
Endemic fauna of Nigeria
Lepidoptera of West Africa
Butterflies described in 1993